= L'Enchaîné du Nord et du Pas-de-Calais =

- l'Enchaîné masthead, August 1941 edition
- Type: Weekly newspaper
- Editor-in-chief: Stêphane Dubled
- Founded: 1923
- Political alignment: Communist
- Language: French language
- Headquarters: Lille
- Circulation: 100,000 (1939)

L'Enchaîné du Nord et du Pas-de-Calais was a Communist Party weekly newspaper published from Lille, France, published on Fridays. Stêphane Dubled was the editor-in-chief of l'Enchaîné.

The first issue of l'Enchaîné was published on 26 May 1923. It replaced a previous Lille-based communist publication, Le Prolétaire. The founding director of the new publication was Guy Jerram, secretary of the Nord federation of the Communist Party. Moreover, the editorial and administrative staff of Le Prolétaire passed on to l'Enchaîné. At the time the Second World War broke out, l'Enchaîné had a circulation of around 100,000.
